The Rivière Blanche is a river of Martinique. It flows into the Lézarde north of Le Lamentin.

See also
List of rivers of Martinique

References

Rivers of Martinique
Rivers of France